Brownstown is a town in Sevier County, Arkansas, United States, east of Ben Lomond.

Geology
The Brownstown Marl underlies Brownstown, and is named after it.

References

Towns in Sevier County, Arkansas
Towns in Arkansas